VITAL for Children is a charitable organization (a registered charity) which works to eliminate child poverty.

It has registered offices in England (charity number 1121532) and the United States. The charity is 501(c)3 registered in the U.S. The main administrative function is carried out at the office on Grosvenor Road in London, England.

VITAL aims to restore the basic human rights to all children suffering from the oppression & injustice of poverty by supporting projects which ensure the many disadvantaged and vulnerable children. That they receive access to quality education, healthcare facilities, nutrition and clean water, protection and emergency shelter.

"In the very heart of Kolkata. From the red light district to the slums and the slave trade, VITAL is tremendously changing the quality of life among untold numbers of children."

Projects

Red Light Project 
Red Light District is part of an urban area where a concentration of prostitution and sex-oriented business, such as sex shops, strip clubs and adult theaters are found. The Red Light District project provides protection, counselling and schooling to over 500 children living in dangerous red light areas where there is a high concentration of hazardous sex work and human trafficking. Vital for children partners with Indian Non-Government organization (NGO) and together they work day and night so that if a child is thrown on to the dangerous, busy streets of the Red Light District while his/her mother works, the child is not left vulnerable. This system prevents cases of trafficking and abuse which are common in the area by providing basic healthcare services, intensive counselling, therapeutic and recreation activities and monthly mother's meeting and house visit which gives the mothers the opportunity to find jobs outside of the red light areas. The choose this project because there is an estimated 400 red light districts in India with millions of prostitutes working in them and 30% is children. The children in those areas are among the most vulnerable to exploitation and abuse as they exist in an environment which is involved with drugs, violence, alcohol, and child trafficking. Many of the children are traumatizes and suffer low self-esteem, hence counseling plays an essential role in our project.

Child Protection and Education 
VITAL is partnered with the Child In Need Institute (CINI) for this project which aims to protect 300 children living in and around the red light area of Rambagan in Kolkata from exploitation and abuse.

The charity provides the many disadvantaged and vulnerable children of the area with access to quality education, protection and basic health services, counselling and recreational activities as well as opportunities to develop leadership and other skills that will provide them with employment prospects.

Child Watch Program 
The Child Watch Program was created to help the many needy and vulnerable street and slum children at high risk, who are lost, abandoned, orphaned, exploited, abused, and suffering from malnutrition or illness.

VITAL in partnership with the Hope Kolkata Foundation, helps identify those children at high risk and protects them by providing day and night surveillance of troublesome areas, 24hr emergency shelter, medical care, nutritious meals and clean drinking water, repatriation of children with their families or placing children in a Hope Home, counselling, education, and recreational facilities.

Anirban Rural Welfare Project 
VITAL has partnered with the Anirban Rural Welfare Society to fund a new project in a community of West Bengal, India. The project comprises a newly implemented school that provides necessary elementary education to 500 underprivileged children living in rural subsistence farming areas.

Fundraising

The charity enters participants into the Locarno Triathlon, Switzerland each year in September. Participants have consistently raised in excess of £5,000 per year.

VITAL hosted a highly successful Black-tie dinner at the House of Lords on 17 December 2009.  Nick Martineau, Christie's auctioneer, auctioned items including High Tea at the House of Lords, tennis lessons with India's number 1 tennis player, tickets to The Championships, Wimbledon, glass making classes and a hat donated by a world-famous milliner.

The Bombay Bicycle Club Restaurants located in Holland Park, Hampstead & Balham, London donated £1 on all main dishes ordered to VITAL on September 21, 2009, a day declared by the United Nations General Assembly as the International Day of Peace.

Donation guarantee 
VITAL guarantees that 100% of donations go directly to the children in need. All administrative fees are covered by the Neuman Foundation.

References

External links 
 MicroGiving
 www.vitalforchildren.org VITAL website
 CINI website
 Hope Kolkata Foundation
 Anirban Rural Welfare Society

Charities based in London
Children's charities based in England
Poverty-related organizations